Natália Falavigna da Silva (born May 9, 1984 in Maringá) is a taekwondo athlete from Brazil. She finished in the fourth place in the women's 67-kilogram category in taekwondo at the 2004 Summer Olympics on August 26, and won the bronze medal at the 2008 Summer Olympics. It was the first Brazilian Olympic medal ever in taekwondo.

Personal life
Falavigna was born in Maringá, and grew up in another city in the Paraná state, Londrina. At the age of four, she saw judoka Aurélio Miguel win a gold medal in the 1988 Summer Olympics and was inspired to become an athlete. She practiced volleyball, basketball, soccer, swimming, and the first she dedicated the most, handball. In 1998, Falavigna was introduced by a friend to taekwondo, and while the first classes were "by impulse", the coach said Falavigna had potential and could become world champion. Two years later, she won the World Junior Taekwondo Championships in Ireland, becoming the first Brazilian to do so. In the four years that followed, Falavigna  ended up on the top three in 9 of the 11 international competitions she entered. In 2003, Falavigna entered a state of depression and even considered trading taekwondo for tennis, but found a new strength to the sport after winning silver at the 2003 Summer Universiade.

Achievements
Natália Falavigna won the following competitions:

 World Taekwondo Championship: 2005
 World University Taekwondo Championship: 2006
 World Junior Taekwondo Championship: 2000

Awards
Falavigna won the Brazilian Olympic Award's Women's Best Athlete of the Year in 2005, and also won the 2002, 2003, 2004, 2005, 2006, 2008, and 2009 Best Taekwondo Athlete.

Career

2000 World Junior Taekwondo Championship
In 2000, two years after starting practicing taekwondo, Falavigna won the World Youth Taekwondo Championship, held in Killarney, Republic of Ireland. It was the first international tournament that she participated in.

2001 World Taekwondo Championship
In 2001, in the World Taekwondo Championship held in Jeju, South Korea, Natália Falavigna won the bronze medal.

2004 Summer Olympics
Natália Falavigna competed for the first time in the Olympics in 2004, when she finished in the fourth place in the competition. She was defeated in the semifinal by Chinese Chen Zhong. In the Repechage semifinals she defeated Italian Daniela Castrignano, but was beaten by Venezuelan Adriana Carmona in the bronze medal match.

2005 World Taekwondo Championship
In 2005, in Madrid, Spain, Natália Falavigna defeated British Sarah Stevenson in the final, and won the World Taekwondo Championship.

2007 World Taekwondo Championship
Falavigna won the bronze medal in the 2007 World Taekwondo Championship held in Beijing, China.

2007 Pan American Games
Natália Falavigna performed the oath of the athletes at the opening ceremony of the Fifteenth Pan American Games in Rio de Janeiro.

She won the silver medal at the women's +67-kilogram category. Falavigna defeated Venezuelan Aura Paez in the semifinals, but was defeated by Mexican María del Rosario Espinoza in the gold medal match.

2008 Summer Olympics
The 2008 Olympic Games, held in Beijing, China, was Natália Falavigna's second participation in the Olympics. In the first stage, she defeated 3–1 the Greek Kyriaki Kouvari. In the quarterfinals, Natália Falavigna beat the Australian Carmen Marton 5–2, but she was defeated by Nina Solheim of Norway in the semifinals. Falavigna won the bronze medal after beating the Swedish Karolina Kedzierska 5–2 in the bronze medal match of the Repechage. Natália Falavigna's bronze medal was Brazil's first Olympic medal ever in taekwondo.

2009 World Taekwondo Championship
In 2009, in the World Taekwondo Championship held in Copenhagen, Denmark, Natália Falavigna won the bronze medal.

References

External links
 Official website 
 

1984 births
Living people
Brazilian people of Italian descent
Brazilian female taekwondo practitioners
Olympic taekwondo practitioners of Brazil
Olympic bronze medalists for Brazil
Taekwondo practitioners at the 2004 Summer Olympics
Taekwondo practitioners at the 2007 Pan American Games
Taekwondo practitioners at the 2008 Summer Olympics
Taekwondo practitioners at the 2011 Pan American Games
Taekwondo practitioners at the 2012 Summer Olympics
People from Maringá
Olympic medalists in taekwondo
Medalists at the 2008 Summer Olympics
Pan American Games silver medalists for Brazil
Pan American Games medalists in taekwondo
Universiade medalists in taekwondo
South American Games gold medalists for Brazil
South American Games silver medalists for Brazil
South American Games medalists in taekwondo
Competitors at the 2002 South American Games
Competitors at the 2014 South American Games
Universiade gold medalists for Brazil
Universiade silver medalists for Brazil
World Taekwondo Championships medalists
Medalists at the 2003 Summer Universiade
Medalists at the 2009 Summer Universiade
Medalists at the 2007 Pan American Games
Sportspeople from Paraná (state)
21st-century Brazilian women